The GE-400 series were time-sharing Information Systems computers by General Electric introduced in 1964 and shipped until 1968.

System description
The GE-400 series (Compatibles/400) came in models: 415, 425, 435 (1964), 455 and 465.
GE-400 systems had a word length of 24 bits which could contain binary data, four six-bit BCD characters, or four signed decimal digits. GE-400 systems could have up to 32,768 words (132K characters) of magnetic-core memory with a cycle time of 2.7 microseconds (435) or 5.1 microseconds (425).  The systems supported up to eight channels for input/output.

The GE 412 (1962) was an incompatible computer system with a 20-bit word length intended for process control applications.

Unique features 
GE-400 systems featured a "variable length, relocatable accumulator" which could be set programmatically to a length of one to four words and relocated to overlay any four adjacent locations in memory (modulo four).  "The accumulator can be moved to the data to be processed, rather than moving the data."

Successor systems 
The 400 series was succeeded by the incompatible 36-bit GE-600 series.

See also
 GE-200 series
 GE-600 series

References

External links
GE-400 Time-sharing information systems: Bring a powerful computer to the fingertips of all your people | 102646147 | Computer History Museum

General Electric
Le Musée Bull Belgique - Luxembourg: GE 400 (in French)

General Electric mainframe computers
Transistorized computers
Computer-related introductions in 1964
24-bit computers